Federico Javier Sardella (born 16 April 1988) is an Argentine footballer.

He played for Gimnasia de Jujuy.

Honours

Player
Banfield
 Argentine Primera División (1): 2009 Apertura

References
 Profile at BDFA 
 

1988 births
Living people
Argentine footballers
Argentine expatriate footballers
Club Atlético Banfield footballers
O'Higgins F.C. footballers
Chilean Primera División players
Argentine Primera División players
Expatriate footballers in Chile
Association football forwards
People from Lomas de Zamora
Sportspeople from Buenos Aires Province